Vijay Kumar Bist (born: 17 September 1957) is an Indian Judge and former Chief Justice of Sikkim High Court and former Judge of Uttarakhand High Court.

Career
Bist was born in Lansdown, Pauri Garhwal district, in Uttarakhand. He passed from Intermediate College Kanskhet, Pauri Garhwal and completed LL.B. from Allahabad University. He started practice under Mr. S.P. Gupta, Senior Advocate from 1984 in the various courts of Uttar Pradesh as well as Allahabad High Court. In his lawyer career, Bist was the Legal advisor and Standing Counsel of Allahabad University, North Eastern Railway, various Corporations, Housing Federation, Development Authority like government undertaking institutions. After the formation of the Uttarakhand, he shifted to Nainital and also served as panel advocate of Uttarakhand State Government in the Uttarakhand High Court. Bist was elevated as Judge of the Uttarakhand High Court on 1 November 2008. On 30 October 2018 Justice Bist was appointed the Chief Justice of Sikkim High Court.
He retired on 16 September 2019.

References

1957 births
Living people
Indian judges
Justices of the Uttarakhand High Court
Garhwali people
Chief Justices of the Sikkim High Court
University of Allahabad alumni
21st-century Indian lawyers
21st-century Indian judges